WAFM is an oldies formatted broadcast radio station licensed to Amory, Mississippi, serving Amory and Monroe County, Mississippi.  WAFM is owned and operated by Stanford Communications, Inc.

External links
FM 95 Online

AFM